The 2004–05 ABN-AMRO Twenty-20 Cup was the first edition of the ABN-AMRO Twenty-20 Cup, a domestic Twenty20 tournament in Pakistan. It was held from 25 to 30 April 2005 in Lahore. The Faisalabad Wolves won the tournament by defeating the Karachi Dolphins in the final. As the winners, the Faisalabad Wolves were invited to compete in the International 20:20 Club Championship in September 2005, which they won.

This was the first Twenty20 tournament in the country, after the introduction of the Twenty20 format in 2003. It was huge success with the final having an attendance of 30,000. It helped increase the popularity of cricket in Pakistan and became an annual tournament.

The tournament also involved a match-throwing incident with Sialkot Stallions captain Shoaib Malik.

Format
The eleven teams are divided into three groups: Groups A and B with four teams each and Group C with three. Each team plays a single round-robin tournament and the top team from each group, determined by a point system, advances to the triangular series. The triangular series is another round-robin tournament where the top two teams advance to the final.

The position of the teams in the points table is determined by:
Total points
Won
Lost (fewest)
Net run rate

Prize money
The winners are awarded a trophy and Rs. 300,000 while the runners-up receive Rs. 150,000.

Results
The top team from each group qualify for the triangular series.

 Qualified for triangular series

 Qualified for final

Fixtures
All times in Pakistan Standard Time (UTC+05:00)

Group stage

Group A

Group B

Group C

Triangular series

Final

Match-throwing incident
The tournament involved a match-throwing incident in the match between the Sialkot Stallions and the Karachi Zebras. Shoaib Malik, the captain of the Stallions, openly admitted to deliberately losing their match against the Karachi Zebras in an attempt to eliminate the Lahore Eagles from the competition. Neither team received points for the match. PCB declared the match void and Karachi Zebras were denied a place in the triangular phase of the ABN Amro Twenty20 Cup despite winning their Pool 'B' fixture against Sialkot Stallions. Malik was expressing his disappointment at earlier decisions in the competition that he felt went against his side and it did not involve any match-fixing or financial implications.

Malik's actions were against his code of conduct as a Test cricketer and had effect on the image of Pakistan cricket, the sponsors and the audience. After realising this, Malik later apologised. He was banned for one Test match and fined Rs. 10,000 and 75% of his match fees for two One Day International matches.

Media coverage
 Ten Sports (live)

References

External links
Tournament page on CricketArchive 
Tournament page on ESPN CricInfo

Domestic cricket competitions in 2004–05
2004-05 National T20 Cup
2005 in Pakistani cricket
Pakistani cricket seasons from 2000–01